The 2022 Carling Black Label Cup was an exhibition tournament between four teams held on 12 November 2022.

Teams 
The sixteen PSL teams were eligible for selection, with supporters casting votes, and the top four going forward to play in the tournament. Votes closed on 1 October 2022. Votes for the top four teams were as follows:

Broadcast Coverage

Venue 
The tournament took place at the FNB Stadium located in Johannesburg,Soweto.

Line-ups 
The starting Line-ups for the tournament

AmaZulu F.C.

Kaizer Chiefs F.C.

Mamelodi Sundowns F.C.

Orlando Pirates F.C.

Semi-finals

3rd Place Match

Final

Statistics

Goals

References

External links 
•black label cup.com Carling black label cup

2022–23 in South African soccer